Allan Lutfy,  (born November 21, 1943) is a Supernumerary Judge of the Federal Court of Canada, having previously served as its Chief Justice prior to retiring from his post on September 30, 2011.

He studied at Loyola College and McGill University (where he was selected as the Articles Editor for the McGill Law Journal) before being called to the Quebec Bar in 1968. He was appointed Queen's Counsel in 1983. He was appointed as a judge of the Federal Court in 1996, made Associate Chief Justice in 1999 and was appointed Chief Justice in 2003 after the passing of the Courts Administration Service Act.

References

External links
 Allan Lutfy at the Federal Court of Canada
 CMAC website. Court Martial Appeal Court biography.

1943 births
Canadian people of Arab descent
Judges of the Federal Court of Canada
Living people
McGill University Faculty of Law alumni
People from Montreal
Canadian King's Counsel
Judges of the Court Martial Appeal Court of Canada